Bemerton Heath Harlequins Football Club is a football club based in Bemerton, Salisbury, England.

History

Bemerton Athletic
The Bemerton Club started as a boys' team in 1945 and after beating every other boys' team in the area, they changed their name to Bemerton Athletic in 1949. The club dominated the Salisbury & District Football League from the start through to the mid-1960s. In 1960–61 they were league champions with a 100% record, also winning the Wiltshire Junior Cup, Morrison Cup, South Wilts Charity 'A' and Lord Bledisloe Cup in the same season. After winning the First Division six seasons in a row, the club moved up to the Wiltshire Football League. They won promotion to Division One in the 1965–66 season. The club won the Wiltshire Combination League in 1972–73 and 1973–74 and the Wiltshire Senior League in 1986–87 after being runners-up for the previous three seasons.

Moon
The club was started in the late 1960s by a group of schoolboys in their mid-teens who played friendlies. They played under the name Bemerton Heath until 1973, when upon entering the Salisbury & District Sunday League, they changed their name to the Conquered Moon. They won Division Three and Division One, the Supplementary Cup and the Sunday Cup on various occasions. They also set a record of playing in seven consecutive Sunday Cup Finals. During the nine years in the Salisbury League, the club made three appearances in the Wiltshire Sunday Cup Final but never won it. The club changed its name back to Bemerton Heath, only to revert to the Conquered Moon two seasons later, to then drop the 'Conquered' in the early 1980s. In 1982, the club moved to the Andover Sunday League and within five seasons, every trophy to be played in had been won at least once. During the sixteen years (1973–1989) of competitive football that the club had played in, they never finished below second place in any league.

Merged club
Bemerton Heath Harlequins was established in May 1989 as a merger of Wiltshire League club Bemerton Athletic, former Salisbury & Andover League club Moon and Bemerton Boys of the Mid-Wilts League. The new club was accepted into the Wessex league for the 1989–90 season. In 1992–93 they entered the FA Cup for the first time, reaching the third qualifying round. The season also saw the club win the Wiltshire Senior Cup, beating Wollen Sports 3–1 in the final, as well as a third-place finish in the Wessex League.

After winning the Wessex League Cup in 2009–10, Bemerton were Wessex League runners-up in 2010–11, also winning the Senior Cup for the third time after a 2–0 win against Bradford Town. The following season saw them finish as league runners-up again, as well as winning the Hampshire FA's Russell Cotes Cup, beating Christchurch 2–0 in the final.

Ground
Bemerton Athletic played at the Salisbury and South Wiltshire Sports Club from 1945 to 1989.

The merged club play at Moon Park on Western Way. The ground has a seated stand on one side of the pitch and a clubhouse with some covered seating behind one goal. It currently has a capacity of 2,100, of which 250 is seated and 350 covered.

Honours
Wessex League
League Cup winners 2009–10
Russell Cotes Cup
Winners 2011–12
Wiltshire Senior Cup
Winners 1992–93, 2010–11

Records
Best FA Cup performance: Third qualifying round, 1992–93
Best FA Vase performance: Fifth round, 1998–99, 2012–13
Record attendance: 1,118 vs Aldershot Town
Most appearances: Keith Richardson

See also
Bemerton Heath Harlequins F.C. players

References

External links

Football clubs in England
Football clubs in Salisbury
Association football clubs established in 1989
1989 establishments in England
Wessex Football League